I'll Find My Way Home is a song written by Jon Anderson and Vangelis for the Jon and Vangelis' 1981 album The Friends of Mr Cairo. The song was released late November 1981. It was later covered by numerous artists, including Demis Roussos, Chayanne, Gregorian, Project Pitchfork, Spanish singer Ana Belén, or Czech singer Hana Zagorová. The song is also featured in the movie The Challengers.

Charts
In the United Kingdom, the single peaked at #6 and was certified Silver (1982) for sales of over 250,000 copies by BPI.

It reached #51 on the Billboard Hot 100 and #41 on the Adult Contemporary chart. In Europe, it peaked at #1 in Switzerland and Poland, #2 Ireland and Netherlands, #3 Belgium, #5 Israel, #6 West Germany, #9 Sweden, #13 France, #19 Austria and also reached #22 in Australia and #45 in New Zealand. In 2012, it reached #4 on the Sweden Digital Songs chart.

Weekly charts

Year-end charts

Certifications

Cover version
A cover version of the Song, Im Land das Ewigkeit heißt, is sung and produced by Waterloo in 1982.

References 

1981 singles
1982 singles
Vangelis songs
Jon Anderson songs
Songs written by Jon Anderson
Songs with music by Vangelis
1981 songs